The Shoal Lakes are lakes located in the southern Interlake region of Manitoba in Canada between Lake Winnipeg and Lake Manitoba. They refer to  North Shoal Lake, West Shoal Lake, and East Shoal Lake. The surrounding territory is generally cattle pasture, with some rocky areas.  Because of the flat nature of the surrounding terrain, small fluctuations in water level significantly affect the local habitat.  The lakes are a significant location for migrating and nesting waterfowl.

History

The three lakes were originally one lake.  In 1912 the Wagon Creek Drain was constructed and the water level fell four to five metres, creating three separate alkaline lakes containing a number of islands.

2010 flood
 
In 2010 the three lakes flooded into one lake,  leaving Highway 299 west of Highway 17 underwater and damaged for 2.5 miles. Highway 518 (Ideal Road) was underwater for one mile south of Highway 415, and Highway 415 west of Inwood, Manitoba was underwater for 2–3 miles.

References

External links
 Shoal Lakes Watershed Study

Lakes of Manitoba